Homodes is a genus of moths of the family Erebidae first described by Achille Guenée in 1852.

Taxonomy
The genus has previously been classified in the subfamily Calpinae of the family Noctuidae.

Description
Palpi upturned and reaching vertex of head, where the third joint very minute. Antennae ciliated. Thorax smoothly scaled. Abdomen with dorsal tufts on proximal segments. Tibia nearly smooth. Forelegs of male with a tuft of long hair from base of coxa. Forewing with round apex. Hindwings with vein 5 from near center of discocellulars.

Species
Homodes bracteigutta (Walker, 1862) India, Thailand, Peninsular Malaysia, Borneo, Saleyer, New Guinea, N.Queensland
Homodes crocea Guenée, 1852 India, Thailand, Andamans, Sundaland, Sulawesi, Seram, Kei, New Guinea, Bismarcks
Homodes fulva Hampson, 1896 Sri Lanka, Borneo
Homodes lassula Prout, 1928 Sumatra, Borneo
Homodes iomolybda Meyrick, 1889 India (Meghalaya), New Guinea
Homodes lithographa Hampson, 1926 Solomon Islands
Homodes magnifica Viette, 1958 Madagascar
Homodes muluensis Holloway, 2005 Borneo
Homodes ornata Roepke, 1938 northern Sulawesi
Homodes perilitha Hampson, 1926 southern India, Borneo, Philippines
Homodes vivida Guenée, 1852 India, Sri Lanka, Myanmar, Singapore, Borneo, Sulawesi

References

Boletobiinae
Noctuoidea genera